Österlund is a Swedish surname, written abroad also as Osterlund. Notable people with the surname include:

John Österlund (1875–1953), Swedish artist and curator
Rod Osterlund, American NASCAR team owner
Tommy Österlund (born 1966), Swedish rower

Swedish-language surnames